Cassell & Co is a British book publishing house, founded in 1848 by John Cassell (1817–1865), which became in the 1890s an international publishing group company.

In 1995, Cassell & Co acquired Pinter Publishers. In December 1998, Cassell & Co was bought by the Orion Publishing Group. In January 2002, Cassell imprints, including the Cassell Reference and Cassell Military were joined with the Weidenfeld imprints to form a new division under the name of Weidenfeld & Nicolson Ltd. Cassell Illustrated survives as an imprint of the Octopus Publishing Group.

History
John Cassell (1817–1865), who was in turn a carpenter, temperance preacher, tea and coffee merchant, finally turned to publishing. His first publication was on 1 July 1848, a weekly newspaper called The Standard of Freedom advocating religious, political, and commercial freedom. The Working Man's Friend became another popular publication. In 1849 Cassell was dividing his time between his publishing and his grocery business. In 1851 his expanding interests led to his renting part of La Belle Sauvage, a London inn which had been a playhouse in Elizabethan times. The former inn was demolished in 1873 to make way for a railway viaduct, with the company building new premises behind. La Belle Sauvage was destroyed in 1941 by WWII bombing as well as many archives.

Thomas Dixon Galpin who came from Dorchester in Dorset and George William Petter who was born in Barnstaple in Devon were partners in a printing firm and on John Cassell's bankruptcy in June 1855 acquired the publishing company and Cassell's debts. Between 1855 and 1858 the printing firm operated as Petter and Galpin and their work was published by W. Kent & Co.

John Cassell was relegated to being a junior partner after becoming insolvent in 1858, the firm being known as Cassell, Petter & Galpin. With the arrival of a new partner, Robert Turner, in 1878, it became Cassell, Petter, Galpin & Company. Galpin was the astute business manager. George Lock, the founder of Ward Lock, another publishing house, was Galpin's first cousin. 

Petter retired in 1883 and the company then became Cassell and Company, Ltd. "The company expanded well until 1888 when Petter died, Galpin retired from managing directorship, and Turner became chairman."

One July 1887 newspaper advertisement for Cassell's National Library, and other libraries, displays the footer "CASSELL & COMPANY, Limited, Ludgate-Hill, London, Paris, New York, and Melbourne."

Sir Thomas Wemyss Reid was general manager until 1905 when Arthur Spurgeon took over and revitalized the firm. Mainly magazine publishers, Spurgeon concentrated on reviving the book business. In 1923 the company was floated on the Stock Exchange and a few years later the magazines owned by the company were sold to Amalgamated Press following many industrial disputes (1931–1933).

In 1969, Cassell was acquired by the American company Crowell Collier & Macmillan (later renamed Macmillan Inc.). Macmillan had previously acquired the religious publisher Geoffrey Chapman. During the 1970s and 1980s Cassell had a branch in Australia known as Cassell Australia. Macmillan sold Cassell, including Geoffrey Chapman, to CBS in 1982. CBS sold Cassell in a buyout in 1986.

In October 1992, Cassell & Co bought Victor Gollancz Ltd from Houghton Mifflin. In December 1998 the company was taken over by Orion Publishing Group. In 1999, Cassell's academic and religious lists were merged with the American company Continuum to form the Continuum International Publishing Group.

Cassell's former book series
 Belle Sauvage Library (1963)
 Cassell's Blue Library (1891)
 Cassell’s National Library (1886-1914)
 Cassell’s Pocket Library (1895, 1928-1955) 
 Cassell's Pocket Reference Library (1910)
 Cassell’s Shilling Novels (1885-1934)
 First Novel Library (1966-1971)
 Helicon Poetry Series (1925)
 Little Classics (1909)
 Living Thoughts Library (1939-1950)
 People’s Library (1907-1933)
 Seafarers’ Library (1928-1929)
 The Unknown Library (fl. 1895)

Cassell's former periodicals

 Cassell's Magazine (1864-73)
 Cassell's household guide : being a complete encyclopaedia of domestic and social economy and forming a guide to every department of practical life 1869
 Cassell's Illustrated Travels fl.1872-3
 Cassell's Family Magazine (1874-97)
 Cassell's Magazine (1897-
 Cassell's Saturday Journal (1883–1921) 
 Cassell's Weekly (1923), then T.P.'s & Cassell's Weekly (1923–1927)
 Chums (1892–1934)
 The Echo (1868–1905)
 The Lady's World (1886), then The Woman's World (1887–1890), edited by Oscar Wilde
 Little Folks (1871–1933), edited by Sam Hield Hamer (1895–1907)
 The Illustrated Magazine of Art (1853–54), then The Magazine of Art (1878–1904)
 The New Magazine (1909–1927)
 The New Penny Magazine (1898–1902), then The Penny Magazine (1903–1925), and Cassell's Popular Magazine (1925)
 The Quiver (1861–1956)
 The Story-Teller (1907–1937)
 Work (1889–1924)

See also
 Gustave Doré's illustrations for La Grande Bible de Tours

References

Further reading

 
 
<li> [ Google Books]
<li> [ Google Books]
<li> Archive

  & .

  & .

External links 
 

1848 establishments in England
Book publishing companies of the United Kingdom
British companies established in 1848
Publishing companies established in 1848
Lagardère Media
Publishing companies based in London
Tea houses of the United Kingdom